Sarah Mateke Nyirabashitsi (born 15 July 1974) is a Ugandan politician and educationist who is the woman representative for Kisoro District, and Minister of State for Gender, Labour and Social Development appointed in 2021 by the President Yoweri Museveni in the Ugandan 11th Parliament.

Early life and education 
Sarah Mateke Nyirabashitsi was born in the Chahi subcounty, Kisoro District in the Kigezi region to Philemon Mateke and Joy Rwanfizi Mateka. She is the third born of six in the family. Her father was a politician, a former State Minister for regional affairs and the mother was a professional teacher.

Nyirabashitsi attended Seseme Integrate School then Maryhill High School for her secondary education. She joined Bugema University and graduated with a Bachelor of Business Administration degree. She also holds a Master's degree in Public Health from the same University and a Postgraduate diploma in Public Administration and Management from Uganda Christian University.

Career 
Nyirabashitsi entered her family's businesses including timber production and transportation. She is the founder of Nyirabashitsi Foundation where she supports children to join boarding secondary schools from senior one to senior six. She is the chairperson of the Board of Trustees of the Metropolitan International University, Makerere Metropolitan Management Institute, Kampala.

Nyirabashitsi joined the public service as Assistant Town clerk of Kisoro town council. After, she contested the role of woman member of parliament of Kisoro District and won against incumbent, Rose Kabagyeni. Nyirabashitsi was appointed Minister of State for Gender, Labour and Social Development (Children and Youth Affairs) replacing Florence Nakiwala Kiyingi. She is affiliated to the National Resistance Movement.

References

External links 
CABINET MEMBERS AND MINISTERS OF STATE OF THE REPUBLIC OF UGANDA

1974 births
Women members of the Parliament of Uganda
Members of the Parliament of Uganda
Uganda Christian University alumni
National Resistance Movement politicians
People from Kisoro District
Living people